Lacomucinaea is a monotypic genus of flowering plants belonging to the family Santalaceae. The only species is Lacomucinaea lineata.

Its native range is Southern Africa.

References

Santalaceae
Monotypic Santalales genera